Leen Bolle (11 April 1879 – 13 December 1942) was a Dutch sculptor. His work was part of the sculpture event in the art competition at the 1928 Summer Olympics.

References

External links
 

1879 births
1942 deaths
20th-century Dutch sculptors
Dutch male sculptors
Olympic competitors in art competitions
Artists from Rotterdam
20th-century Dutch male artists